Iva Slonjšak (born 16 April 1997 in Zagreb) is a Croatian female professional basketball player currently playing for Saint Amand Hainaut Basketball, France. Before Cinkarna Celje she played for Trešnjevka 2009.

References

External links
Profile at eurobasket.com

1997 births
Living people
Basketball players from Zagreb
Croatian women's basketball players
Power forwards (basketball)
Croatian expatriate basketball people in Slovenia